Ivor J. Davidson is a British theologian and academic administrator.

Davidson held chairs in Systematic and Historical Theology at the University of Otago, New Zealand, where he was based from 1997 until 2009, and the University of St Andrews, 2009–16. He is an Honorary Professor in Theology at the University of Aberdeen.

At the University of St Andrews, Davidson was Head of School and Dean of the Faculty of Divinity and Principal of St Mary's College, 2010–13. He was educated in Classics and Theology at the University of Glasgow and the University of Edinburgh.

Books
 Salvation. Bloomsbury T & T Clark 2016
 A Short History of Arianism. Cambridge University Press 2017
 The Cambridge Handbook of Early Christian Theology. Cambridge University Press 2017
 The Study of Theology. SPCK 2017
 God of Salvation: Soteriology in Theological Perspective. Ivor J. Davidson and Murray A. Rae. Ashgate 2011.
 A Public Faith: From Constantine to the Medieval World, AD 312-600.   Baker/Monarch 2005
 Birth of the Church: From Jesus to Constantine, AD 30-312., Baker, 2004/Monarch, 2005
 Ambrose: De Officiis : Edited with an Introduction, Translation and Commentary (2 vols). Oxford University Press, 2002

References

Scottish Christian theologians
Academics of the University of St Andrews
Living people
Year of birth missing (living people)
Academic staff of the University of Otago